South Buffalo North Side Light is a lighthouse formerly located at the entrance to Buffalo Harbor, Buffalo, New York. It is one of two "bottle shaped" beacons located in Buffalo Harbor; the other is the Buffalo North Breakwater South End Light. It is distinguished by four cast iron port windows and a curved iron door. It was first lit on September 1, 1903, and originally equipped with a 6th-order Fresnel lens. A battery operated 12 volt lamp with a  green plastic lens was installed in the beacon c. 1960, when a domed roof formerly mounted over the lens was removed. The beacon was removed in 1985, and now stands at the gate to the Dunkirk Lighthouse and Veterans Park Museum. Its twin is located on the grounds of the Buffalo (main) Light.

It was listed on the National Register of Historic Places in 1983.

References

External links
 
 Inventory of Historic Light Stations--New York Lighthouses
 South Buffalo North Side Light - U.S. National Register of Historic Places on Waymarking.com
 Dunkirk Lighthouse and Veterans Park Museum website

Further reading
 

Lighthouses completed in 1903
Lighthouses on the National Register of Historic Places in New York (state)
National Register of Historic Places in Erie County, New York
Lighthouses in Erie County, New York
1903 establishments in New York (state)